Agost is a Valencian town and municipality located in the province of Alicante, Spain, at a distance of about  from Alicante, the capital of the province. Due to its relative distance from the Mediterranean Sea, Agost was not directly affected by the mass tourism that the towns on the Costa Blanca experienced, and has maintained its local character.

Until the sixties, the economy of Agost was mainly based on pottery and agriculture. Today most of the traditional potteries have closed, or turned into factories producing construction elements. There are still about 11 potteries active in the town; six of them still produce traditional pottery. Agriculture remains a second income source for many families in Agost.

Sights
The church (Sant Pere Apòstol)
The hermitage (Ermita de les Santes Justa i Rufina) built in 1821 
The ruins of an old castle (Castell d'Agost and Castell de la Murta)
Agost's museum (Museu de Cantereria), pottery museum in a turn-of-the-century pottery complex

Fiestas
Santíssima Mare de Déu de la Pau (15 – 24 January)
El dia de la Vella (3 weeks after Ash Wednesday)
Moros i Cristians, Saint Peter's day (end of June)
Les danses del Rei Moro  (26 December)

References

External links

 Official website of Agost, Valencian and Spanish
 Pottery Museum in Agost, Spanish
Nature around Agost
 Accommodation in an old pottery complex + workplace for potters/ ceramists, Spanish
 University of Alicante: Information about the pottery museum in English
 Private website about Agost, Valencian 

Municipalities in the Province of Alicante
Alacantí